Denisova Daria (born 19 July 1989) is a Ukrainian painter, book illustrator, member of Ukrainian national painters community.

Life
Daria was born into a family of artists. Her father, Denisov Andrew, is a painter-muralist. Daria's mother, Denisova Svetlana, works as an architect. Nowadays Svetlana manages children art-school. Daria's parents have grown up her passion for arts from the childhood. They also helped Daria to master different art techniques and to level up her skills.  Daria became the student of the art high school in the age of 15. She graduated Kharkiv State Academy of Design and Fine Arts in the age of 22.
Daria joined the Ukrainian national painters community in 2015.

Education
2004–06 Artist High School of Kharkiv
2006–12 Kharkiv State Academy of Design and Fine Arts.
Became a member of young painters' community in 2015

Arts

Daria's paintings can be found on numerous exhibitions, fine art galleries and private collections in the United States, Europe, Russia, Ukraine, India and Israel.

Cats are the most common characters on Daria's scenes. 
Daria calls it the "Happy Art" movement. She get inspiration from the overseas travelling and from the family circle. Daria started to experiment with techniques of different kinds from the very childhood. She even painted a church in a town of Buddy, Ukraine. Together with her husband Daria visited such countries, as United States, Spain, Cambodia, Thailand, India, Sri Lanka, Montenegro, Serbia, Bosnia and Herzegovina etc. Every journey has inspired Daria to create a brand new collection of painting. All of them are exhibited both in the Ukraine and abroad.

References

External links
 Objectiv TV Report
 Exhibition in the Buzok gallery
 Belgium portfolio
 Happy Art in the commerce
 Happy Art in the Ukrainian media
 Illustrations for the Airport magazine

1989 births
Living people
21st-century Ukrainian painters
21st-century Ukrainian women artists